The PEN Award for Poetry in Translation is given by PEN America (formerly PEN American Center) to honor a poetry translation published in the preceding year. The award should not be confused with the PEN Translation Prize. The award is one of many PEN awards sponsored by International PEN in over 145 PEN centers around the world. The PEN American Center awards have been characterized as being among the "major" American literary prizes. The award was called one of "the most prominent translation awards."

Guidelines
The $3,000 award is given to a book-length translation of poetry into English published in the United States the previous year. Up to two translators may work on the book. Translators may be of any nationality.

Winners

See also
American poetry
List of poetry awards
List of literary awards
List of years in poetry
List of years in literature

References

External links
PEN Award for Poetry in Translation, official website.

PEN America awards
Awards established in 1996
1996 establishments in New York City
Translation awards
American poetry awards